Stephane Moraille (born August 13, 1970, Port-au-Prince) is a Haitian-born singer-songwriter and lawyer from Quebec.

She began her musical career in 1993 under the pseudonym Shauna Davis, releasing several dance and house music singles that received regular airplay on MuchMusic, MusiquePlus, and radio stations like Energy 108 and Hot 103.5 in Toronto. In 1997 she achieved wider success with the Montreal band Bran Van 3000 with the album Glee. A member of the group since its inception, she sings on the three subsequent albums, Discosis, Rosé and The Garden. In 2017, she released her first solo EP, Pi Wo, a prelude to her album Daïva, which was released on February 23, 2018.

Stephane Moraille was also a candidate for the New Democratic Party in the federal riding of Bourassa in the November 25, 2013, by-election.

She is a lawyer specializing in media law, she has been a member of the Bar since 2001.

She was appointed on June 6, 2018, as an independent member of the board of directors of the Conseil des arts et des lettres du Québec.

Music

1993–1999 : Shauna Davis Project 
Stephane Moraille made her name in the world of electronic music with the Shauna Davis Project in 1995. The hit Get Away was nominated for a Juno Award and a Much Music Video Award in Canada. The success of the song enabled her to tour the world and share the stage with DJ/producers such as David Morales, Stonebridge and Todd Terry. In 1999 the hit Try my Love was nominated for a Juno award in the best dance Recording category.

1997–2001 : Bran Van 3000 
Founding member of the Bran Van 3000 collective. The album Glee, released in 1997, was certified gold. Moraille's voice is featured on the song Drinking in L.A., which reached the top five of the pop and alternative charts worldwide, and peaked at number two in the UK.

The song has been featured in numerous films, TV shows and advertising campaigns, earning the collective a host of awards.

2017–present : Stéphane Moraille 
In 2017, Stephane with an EP Pi Wo and the subsequent album Daiva.

Discographie

Law 
Stephane has a master's degree in intellectual property law from the Osgoode Hall Law School. After passing the Quebec bar, she began practicing law in 2005. Her mentors include renowned entertainment lawyers Mes Zénaïde Lussier and Claire Benoit. In 2014, she founded her own law firm, Avocat Soliste. Since 2017, she has been Director of Legal and Business Affairs for PHI and the PHI Foundation for Contemporary Arts. She teaches contract law at the School of Show Business, at the College of the Institut national de l'image et du son and for the RFAVQ.

Politics 
In 2012 Moraille joined the NDP party under then leader Thomas Mulcair. In 2013 she announced that she would be running for the federal NDP nomination in the Montreal riding of Bourassa. She was not elected.

Awards and achievements 
Moraille has received numerous awards and recognition in the music industry as a member of Bran Van 3000 including Félix, Juno, Much Music Video Award, SOCAN prize, Videofact Award, Canadian Radio Award, and Soba Award and in 2015 Moraille was nominated for the Slaight Family Polaris Heritage Prize.

References

External links 
Official website

1970 births
Canadian women singer-songwriters
Songwriters from Quebec
French-language singers of Canada
Living people
Singers from Montreal
21st-century Canadian women singers
Lawyers from Montreal
21st-century Canadian politicians
Canadian people of Haitian descent
Haitian Quebecers
Politicians from Montreal
Haitian emigrants to Canada
Canadian lawyers
New Democratic Party candidates for the Canadian House of Commons
Osgoode Hall Law School alumni